Patton is a 1970 American epic biographical war film about U.S. General George S. Patton during World War II. It stars George C. Scott as Patton and Karl Malden as General Omar Bradley, and was directed by Franklin J. Schaffner from a script by Francis Ford Coppola and Edmund H. North, who based their screenplay on Patton: Ordeal and Triumph by Ladislas Farago and Bradley's memoir, A Soldier's Story.

Patton won seven Academy Awards, including Best Picture, Best Director and Best Original Screenplay. Scott also won the Academy Award for Best Actor for his portrayal of General Patton, but declined to accept the award. The opening monologue, delivered by Scott as General Patton with an enormous American flag behind him, remains an iconic and often quoted image in film. In 2003, Patton was selected for preservation in the United States National Film Registry by the Library of Congress as being "culturally, historically or aesthetically significant". The Academy Film Archive also preserved Patton in 2003.

Plot
General George S. Patton addresses an unseen audience of American troops, emphasizing the importance Americans place upon victorious role models as well as his own demands that his men defeat the enemy by working and fighting as a team.

In its first encounter with the German Afrika Korps at Kasserine, the II Corps is humiliatingly defeated by General Erwin Rommel, whom Patton places in high regard as a well respected rival. As a consequence, Patton is placed in command of II Corps and immediately begins instilling discipline amongst his untested troops. Alongside the poor condition of American soldiers in the II Corps, Patton also identifies the stubbornness of his British counterpart; General Bernard Montgomery constantly undermines American forces in order to monopolize the war glory. Patton's chance to prove his worth comes at the subsequent Battle of El Guettar where Patton defeats the advancing German forces.

The eventual Allied victory in North Africa prompts both Patton and Montgomery to come up with competing plans for the Sicily invasion. Patton's plan, drawn from reference to the Peloponnesian War highlights the strategic importance of Syracuse; if it fell to an occupying force, the Italians would surely withdraw. Patton proposes that Montgomery captures Syracuse, whereas he will land near Palermo then capture Messina to cut off the withdrawal. Though the plan initially impresses General Alexander, to whom Patton and Montgomery report, General Eisenhower turns it down in favor of Montgomery's more cautious plan that the two armies land side-by-side in the south-east, essentially relegating Patton to guarding the left flank of the British advance. Angered by the lack of progress being made, Patton thrusts west and captures Palermo, before beating Montgomery to Messina. Patton's blunt aggression sits poorly with his subordinates Omar Bradley and Lucian Truscott. During a visit to a field hospital, Patton notices a soldier, crying out of shell shock. Surmising that the soldier isn't actually physically injured, Patton slaps the soldier and threatens to shoot him for his cowardice and demands he return to the frontline. Eisenhower demands Patton apologize to his entire command for the altercation. Though Patton obliges, he is stunned to find out that Bradley, not he, has been given command of American forces preparing for the invasion of France.

With the Invasion of Normandy due to start, Patton is placed in charge of the fictional First United States Army Group as a decoy in London, the Allied consensus believing that his presence in England will tell the Germans that he will lead the invasion of Europe. At a war drive in Knutsford, Patton openly remarks that the post-war world will be dominated by British and American influence, seen as a slight to the Soviet Union. Though Patton objects to having done anything wrong, the situation has already spiraled from his control. The decision to send him home or keep him in England rests upon General George Marshall. Though he is not present during the D-Day landings, Patton is given command of the Third Army by General Bradley, now his superior. Under Patton's leadership, the Third Army sweeps brilliantly across France but is unexpectedly brought to a halt when the supplies are diverted to Montgomery's ambitious Operation Market Garden.

During the Battle of the Bulge Patton devises a plan to relieve the trapped 101st Airborne Division in Bastogne, which he does before smashing through the Siegfried Line and into Germany.

Germany eventually capitulates, though Patton's outspokenness lands him in trouble once again when he compares American politics to Nazism. Though he loses his command once again, Patton is kept on to see the rebuilding of Germany in the post war period. In a final scene Patton is seen walking Willie, his bull terrier. Patton's voice is heard:

"For over a thousand years, Roman conquerors returning from the wars enjoyed the honor of a triumph - a tumultuous parade. In the procession came trumpeters and musicians and strange animals from the conquered territories, together with carts laden with treasure and captured armaments. The conqueror rode in a triumphal chariot, the dazed prisoners walking in chains before him. Sometimes his children, robed in white, stood with him in the chariot, or rode the trace horses. A slave stood behind the conqueror, holding a golden crown, and whispering in his ear a warning: that all glory ... is fleeting."

Cast

 George C. Scott as Lieutenant General George S. Patton
 Karl Malden as Lieutenant General Omar N. Bradley
 David Bauer as Lieutenant General Harry Buford
 Edward Binns as Lieutenant General Walter Bedell Smith
 John Doucette as Major General Lucian Truscott
 Michael Strong as Brigadier General Hobart Carver
 Peter Barkworth as Colonel John Welkin
 Lawrence Dobkin as Colonel Gaston Bell
 Paul Stevens as Lieutenant Colonel Charles R. Codman
 Morgan Paull as Captain Richard N. Jenson
 Stephen Young as Captain Chester B. Hansen
 James Edwards as Sergeant William George Meeks
 Tim Considine as a shell-shocked soldier
 Michael Bates as General Bernard Montgomery
 Jack Gwillim as General Sir Harold Alexander
 Gerald Flood as Air Chief Marshal Sir Arthur Tedder
 John Barrie as Air Vice-Marshal Sir Arthur Coningham
 Frank Latimore as Lieutenant Colonel Henry Davenport
 Karl Michael Vogler as Field Marshal Erwin Rommel
 Richard Münch as Colonel General Alfred Jodl
 Siegfried Rauch as Captain Oskar Steiger

Production

Lee Marvin, Burt Lancaster, John Wayne, Robert Mitchum and Rod Steiger all turned down the role of Patton; Steiger later said it was his greatest mistake. Charlton Heston was considered for the role of Omar N. Bradley before Karl Malden was cast.

Development
Attempts to make a film about the life of Patton had been ongoing since he died in 1945, but his widow, Beatrice, resisted. After her death in 1953, producer Frank McCarthy began the project and, the day after Beatrice was buried, the producers contacted the family for help in making the film, requesting access to Patton's diaries, as well as input from family members, but the family refused to provide any assistance to the film's producers. McCarthy also sought co-operation from The Pentagon; they also initially refused, as Patton's son, George Patton IV, was in the Army, and Patton's second daughter, Ruth, was married to an officer. By 1959, McCarthy had convinced the Army to co-operate.

20th Century Fox bought A Soldier's Story, the 1951 autobiography of General of the Army Omar Bradley (who features prominently in the film, played by Karl Malden). Francis Ford Coppola wrote the film script in 1963 based largely on Ladislas Farago's 1963 biography Patton: Ordeal and Triumph, and on A Soldier's Story. Edmund H. North was later brought in to help work on the script. The film was originally to be called Blood & Guts and William Wyler was originally scheduled to direct. However, Wyler quit before the planned starting date of January 1969.

Bradley, the only surviving five-star general officer in the United States after the death of Dwight D. Eisenhower in 1969, served as a consultant for the film though the extent of his influence and input into the final script is largely unknown. While Bradley knew Patton personally, it was also well known that the two men were polar opposites in personality, and there is evidence to conclude that Bradley despised Patton, both personally and professionally. As the film was made without access to General Patton's diaries, it largely relied upon observations by Bradley and other military contemporaries when they attempted to reconstruct Patton's thoughts and motives. In a review of the film, Brigadier General S.L.A. Marshall, who knew both Patton and Bradley, stated, "The Bradley name gets heavy billing on a picture of [a] comrade that, while not caricature, is the likeness of a victorious, glory-seeking buffoon.... Patton in the flesh was an enigma. He so stays in the film.... Napoleon once said that the art of the general is not strategy but knowing how to mold human nature.... Maybe that is all producer Frank McCarthy and Gen. Bradley, his chief advisor, are trying to say."

Filming

The film started shooting February 3, 1969 and was shot at seventy-one locations in six countries, mostly in Spain, which had a lot of the U.S. Army's World War II surplus equipment.
Francoist Spain had sustained a currency control for decades and filming in the country was the only way to indirectly recover the profits of the box office from American films.
Cheap labor also encouraged runaway productions.

One scene, which depicts Patton driving up to an ancient city that is implied to be Carthage, was shot in the ancient Roman Mauretanian city of Volubilis, Morocco. The early scene, where Patton and Muhammed V are reviewing Moroccan troops including the Goumiers, was shot at the Royal Palace in Rabat. One unannounced battle scene was shot the night before, which raised fears in the Royal Palace neighborhood of a coup d'état. One paratrooper was electrocuted in power lines, but none of this battle footage appears in the film. The scene at the dedication of the welcome centre in Knutsford, Cheshire, England, was filmed at the actual site. The scenes set in Tunisia and Sicily were shot in Almeria in the south of Spain; Pamplona in the north was used for France and Germany; while the winter scenes in Belgium, including for the Battle of the Bulge sequence, were shot near Segovia (to which the production crew rushed when they were informed that snow had fallen). Interior shots were filmed in Seville.

The film was shot by cinematographer Fred J. Koenekamp in 65 mm Dimension 150, only the second film to be shot in that format after The Bible: In the Beginning... (1966).

A sizeable amount of battle scene footage was left out of the final cut of Patton, but a use was soon found for it. Outtakes from Patton were used to provide battle scenes in the made-for-TV film Fireball Forward, which was first broadcast in 1972. The film was produced by Patton producer Frank McCarthy and Edmund North wrote the screenplay. One of the cast members of Patton, Morgan Paull, appeared in this production.

Opening

The film opens with Scott's rendering of Patton's speech to the Third Army, set against a huge American flag. Coppola and North had to tone down Patton's actual words and statements in the scene, as well as throughout the rest of the film, to avoid an R rating; in the opening monologue, the word fornicating replaced fucking when he was criticizing The Saturday Evening Post. Also, Scott's gravelly and scratchy voice is the opposite of Patton's high-pitched, nasal and somewhat squeaky voice, a point noted by historian S.L.A. Marshall. However, Marshall also points out that the film contains "too much cursing and obscenity [by Patton]. Patton was not habitually foul-mouthed. He used dirty words when he thought they were needed to impress."

When Scott learned that the speech would open the film, he refused to do it, as he believed that it would overshadow the rest of his performance. Director Schaffner assured him that it would be shown at the end. The scene was shot in one afternoon at Sevilla Studios in Madrid, with the flag having been painted on the back of the stage wall.

All the medals and decorations shown on Patton's uniform in the monologue are replicas of those actually awarded to Patton. However, the general never wore all of them in public and was in any case not a four-star general at the time he made the famous speeches on which the opening is based. He wore them all on only one occasion, in his backyard in Virginia at the request of his wife, who wanted a picture of him with all his medals. The producers used a copy of this photo to help recreate this "look" for the opening scene.

Music
The critically acclaimed score for Patton was composed and conducted by the prolific composer Jerry Goldsmith. Goldsmith used a number of innovative methods to tie the music to the film, such as having an echoplex loop recorded sounds of "call to war" triplets played on the trumpet to musically represent General Patton's belief in reincarnation. The main theme also consisted of a symphonic march accompanied by a pipe organ to represent the militaristic yet deeply religious nature of the protagonist. The music to Patton subsequently earned Goldsmith an Oscar nomination for Best Original Score and was one of the American Film Institute's 250 nominees for the top twenty-five American film scores. The original soundtrack has been released three times on disc and once on LP: through Twentieth-Century Fox Records in 1970, Tsunami Records in 1992, Film Score Monthly in 1999, and a two-disc extended version through Intrada Records in 2010.

2010 Intrada Records album

Disc One

Disc Two

Release
The film had its premiere on Wednesday, February 4, 1970 at the Criterion Theatre in New York before its roadshow release starting the following day.

First telecast
Patton was first telecast by ABC as a three hours-plus color film special on Sunday, November 19, 1972, only two years after its theatrical release. That was highly unusual at the time, especially for a roadshow release which had played in theatres for many months. Most theatrical films at that time had to wait at least five years for their first telecast. Another unusual element of the telecast was that almost none of Patton's profanity-laced dialogue was cut (only two sentences, one of which contained no profanity, were cut from the famous opening speech in front of the giant US flag). The film was the fourth highest-rated film broadcast on television in the United States at the time, with a Nielsen rating of 38.5 and an audience share of 65%.

Home media
In 1977, Patton was among the first 50 VHS and Betamax releases from Magnetic Video. The film would be released on Laserdisc in 1981, also by Magnetic Video. A widescreen version was released in 1989, which includes four newsreels about the real Patton. A THX-certified Laserdisc would be released on July 9, 1997, trading the newsreels for many new features. A THX-certified widescreen VHS was also released in 1998 by the same distributor, 20th Century Fox Home Entertainment.

Patton was first released on DVD in 1999, featuring an audio commentary by Charles M. Province, the founder of The George S. Patton, Jr. Historical Society, and again in 2006, with a commentary by screenwriter Francis Ford Coppola and extra bonus features.

The film made its Region A (locked) Blu-ray debut in 2008 to much criticism, for its excessive use of digital noise reduction on the picture quality. In 2012, a remaster was released with much improved picture quality. In June 2013, Fox UK released the film on Region B Blu-ray but reverted to the 2008 transfer.

Reception

Box office
The film grossed an estimated $51,000 in its first week. According to Fox records the film required $22,525,000 in theatrical rentals to break even and by 11 December 1970 had made $27,650,000 so made a profit to the studio. Eventually, it returned worldwide rentals of $45 million, including $28.1 million from the United States and Canada from a gross of $61.8 million.

Critical response
Roger Ebert said of George C. Scott, "It is one of those sublime performances in which the personalities of the actor and the character are fulfilled in one another." Gene Siskel gave the film three stars out of four and wrote that George C. Scott "has created an acting tour de force," but found it "repetitive – the second half doesn't tell us anything more than the first." Vincent Canby of The New York Times wrote, "The most refreshing thing about 'Patton' is that here—I think for the first time—the subject matter and the style of the epic war movie are perfectly matched ... Although the cast is large, the only performance of note is that of Scott, who is continuously entertaining and, occasionally, very appealing." Charles Champlin of the Los Angeles Times wrote, "'Patton' has, like Lawrence of Arabia, done the near-impossible by creating a finely detailed portrait despite all the tuggings toward simplification which are inevitable in the big budget, long, loud roadshow production desperate to attract mass audiences. As Patton, George Scott gives one of the great and unforgettable screen characterizations." Gary Arnold of The Washington Post wrote that the film "eventually shares the dramatic limitations, as well as the visual triumphs, of Lawrence of Arabia: yet another fascinating but inconclusive portrait of a mercurial military leader. The camera focus is sharp, but the dramatic focus is blurred. We never quite understand Patton in historical context, in relation to the other generals of the period, and to the entire Allied war effort." Pauline Kael of The New Yorker wrote that "technically the movie is awesomely impressive," but went on to state that "I'm sure it will be said that the picture is 'true' to Patton and to history, but I think it strings us along and holds out on us. If we don't just want to have our prejudices greased, we'll find it confusing and unsatisfying, because we aren't given enough information to evaluate Patton's actions." John Gillett of The Monthly Film Bulletin wrote, "While communicating a relish for the man with all his warts, [Schaffner] also pinpoints the monstrous prejudices which lay beneath the surface. And, of course, he chose the right actor. Karl Malden's Bradley is neatly observed and the German players are good, but Scott's performance rightly dwarfs all the rest."

Online film critic James Berardinelli has called Patton his favorite film of all time and "to this day one of Hollywood's most compelling biographical war pictures."

According to Bob Woodward and Carl Bernstein's book The Final Days, it was also Richard Nixon's favorite film. Nixon first viewed Patton with his family at a private screening in the White House Family Theater on April 5, 1970. Nixon became obsessed with the film, repeatedly watching it with Henry Kissinger over the next month. He screened it several times at the White House and during a cruise on the presidential yacht USS Sequoia in the Potomac River. Kissinger sarcastically wrote of Nixon's insistence that he see the film on the cruise: "It was the second time he had so honored me. Inspiring as the film no doubt was, I managed to escape for an hour in the middle of it to prepare for the next day’s NSC meeting." Before the 1972 Nixon visit to China, Chinese Premier Zhou Enlai watched this film in preparation for his meeting with Nixon.

Review aggregate website Rotten Tomatoes reported that 90% of critics gave the film a positive review based on 52 reviews, with an average score of 8.4/10. Rotten Tomatoes summarizes the critical consensus as, "George C. Scott's sympathetic, unflinching portrayal of the titular general in this sprawling epic is as definitive as any performance in the history of American biopics."

Accolades
In 1971, the film was nominated for 10 Academy Awards at 1971 ceremony, winning seven awards (including Best Picture). George C. Scott also won the Academy Award for Best Actor for his performance, but he famously refused to accept it, citing a dislike of the voting process and the concept of acting competitions. (The film's producer, Frank McCarthy, accepted the award on Scott's behalf.) He was the first actor to do so.

The Best Picture statuette is on display at the George C. Marshall Museum at the Virginia Military Institute, courtesy of Frank McCarthy.

In 2006, the Writers Guild of America selected Francis Ford Coppola and Edmund H. North's adapted screenplay as the 94th best screenplay of all time.

American Film Institute Lists
 AFI's 100 Years...100 Movies – #89
 AFI's 100 Years...100 Heroes and Villains:
 George S. Patton – #29 Hero

Sequel
A made-for-television sequel, The Last Days of Patton, was produced in 1986. Scott reprised his title role. The film was based on Patton's final weeks after being mortally injured in a car accident, with flashbacks of Patton's life.

See also

 List of American films of 1970
 1970s in film

Notes

Further reading
 In 2005, Patton's wife's "Button Box" manuscript was finally released by his family, with the posthumous release of Ruth Ellen Patton Totten's book, The Button Box: A Daughter's Loving Memoir of Mrs. George S. Patton.
  Suid's book contains an extended discussion of the production of Patton and of public and critical response to the film; the discussion occupies most of the chapter, "13. John Wayne, The Green Berets, and Other Heroes".

External links

 
 
 
 
 
 
 

1970 films
1970 war films
1970s biographical drama films
American biographical drama films
American epic films
American historical films
American war drama films
Cultural depictions of George S. Patton
Cultural depictions of Erwin Rommel
Cultural depictions of Bernard Montgomery
American war epic films
American World War II films
World War II films based on actual events
North African campaign films
Best Picture Academy Award winners
Biographical films about military leaders
Films about armoured warfare
Films set in the 1940s
Films set in Morocco
Films set in Tunisia
Films set in Sicily
Films set in France
Films set in Belgium
Films set in Germany
Films shot in Algeria
Films featuring a Best Actor Academy Award-winning performance
Films featuring a Best Drama Actor Golden Globe winning performance
Films that won the Best Sound Mixing Academy Award
Films whose art director won the Best Art Direction Academy Award
Films whose director won the Best Directing Academy Award
Films whose editor won the Best Film Editing Academy Award
Films whose writer won the Best Original Screenplay Academy Award
20th Century Fox films
Films directed by Franklin J. Schaffner
Films with screenplays by Francis Ford Coppola
Films scored by Jerry Goldsmith
Films about the United States Army
United States National Film Registry films
Films shot in Almería
Films shot in Crete
1970 drama films
Films set in Cheshire
1970s English-language films
1970s American films
Films shot in Navarre